Sydney Missionary and Bible College (SMBC) is an independent, evangelical interdenominational Bible college in Sydney, Australia.

The college was founded in 1916 by C. Benson Barnett. Its goal is to train people for ministry in Australia and abroad. There are two campuses, one in Croydon and another in Croydon Park (opened in 2010).

SMBC is Bible-centred: the academic curriculum is dominated by the Bible and a key focus of the college is to train men and women for gospel ministry in Australia and overseas in a missionary context.

Stuart Coulton, a former principal of SMBC, retired at the beginning of 2020.

Derek Brotherson was appointed as the principal of SMBC in 2020.

SMBC hosts various public talks to give a biblical perspective on current issues such as social media, disability, atheism and miracles.

History 

Barnett wrote in 1916, "not only are we a Bible College, but we are a Missionary College ... we are taught by Christ, that we are to pray to the Lord of the Harvest that He will send forth labourers into His harvest field".

In 2016 a centennial history of SMBC was written by the Rev Anthony Brammall, who is the Academic Vice-Principal at the college and a lecturer in New Testament studies.

SMBC Press 
SMBC has published a number of books as well as other resources.

References

External links 

Seminaries and theological colleges in New South Wales
Education in Sydney
Bible colleges
Educational institutions established in 1916
Australian College of Theology
1916 establishments in Australia